The Zimbabwe Fed Cup team represents Zimbabwe in Fed Cup tennis competition and are governed by Tennis Zimbabwe.  They have not competed since 2008.

History
Zimbabwe competed in its first Fed Cup in 1966, as Rhodesia. In the opening match, they defeated Austria in a clean sweep (3-0) with Patricia Walkden recording the first victory for the team. In the second round, they would lose to Italy by the same margin to record their best result of the round of 16. After losing to the United States in 1967 and 1972 (they entered 1971 but withdrew), they entered the consolation round and they would knock over Norway in the first round of consolation before losing to Japan in the doubles rubber to be knocked out. 

After they withdrew again in 1975, they entered the 1976 edition hoping for a better display.

Players

See also
Fed Cup
Zimbabwe Davis Cup team

References

External links

Billie Jean King Cup teams
Fed Cup
Fed Cup